The UCLA men's volleyball program began its first year in 1953. Al Scates had been the head coach each year since 1963 until his retirement after the 2012 season. John Speraw took over as head coach after Scates retirement, and has led the team since then. As a member of the Mountain Pacific Sports Federation(MPSF), the Bruins play most of their home matches in Pauley Pavilion. When Pauley is not available, they play in the Wooden Center.

Scates had more wins than any other NCAA Division I men's volleyball coach, with a record (since 1970, since no records were kept from 1953 to 1969) of 1,239–290.

NCAA Championships
The Bruins have won 19 NCAA championships.

MPSF Championships
 2022 regular season champions

Season-by-season results

 Updated through April 12, 2022

Olympians
Former players who have gone to the Olympic Games to play or coach.
 Mike O’Hara, Ernie Suwara, Keith Erickson (1964)
 Larry Rundle (1968)
 Karch Kiraly, Steve Salmons, Dave Saunders (1984)
 Karch Kiraly, Ricci Luyties, Doug Partie, Dave Saunders (1988)
 Doug Partie*, Fred Sturm (coach), Greg Giova-nazzi (Asst. Coach) (1992)
 Carl Henkel, Karch Kiraly, Dan Landry, Bjorn Maaseide (Norway), Jeff Nygaard, Sinjin Smith, Kent Steffes, Fred Sturm (Coach), Rudy Suwara (Asst. Coach) (1996)
 Dan Landry, Jeff Nygaard, Erik Sullivan, Bjorn Maaseide (Norway), Mark Williams (Australia), Kevin Wong (2000)
 Bjorn Maaseide (Norway), Stein Metzger, Jeff Nygaard, Erik Sullivan, Mark Williams (Australia) (2004)
 John Speraw (Assistant Coach-men) (2008)
 John Speraw (Assistant Coach-men) (2000), Karch Kiraly (Assistant Coach-women) (2012)
 John Speraw* (Head Coach-men), Karch Kiraly* (Head Coach-women) (2016)
 John Speraw (Head Coach-men), Mitch Stahl, Garrett Muagututia, Erik Sullivan (asst.), Karch Kiraly* (Head Coach-women) (2020)

''Note: Team won gold medal in bold, team won bronze medal (*)

Postseason

See also
List of NCAA men's volleyball programs

References

External links